Oliver Seymour Youll (born 11 December 1970) is an English cricketer.  Youll is a left-handed batsman who bowls leg break.  He was born in Newcastle, Northumberland.

Youll made his debut for Northumberland in the 1992 Minor Counties Championship against Staffordshire.  Youll played Minor counties cricket for Northumberland from 1992 to 1999, which included 41 Minor Counties Championship matches and 10 MCCA Knockout Trophy matches.  In 1994, he made his List A debut against Nottinghamshire in the NatWest Trophy.  In this match he scored 17*.  He made a further appearance against Ireland in the 1999 NatWest Trophy.  In this match he scored 65 runs, before being dismissed by Dwayne McGerrigle.

He is the son of the former Warwickshire and Northumberland cricketer Michael Youll.

References

External links
Oliver Youll at ESPNcricinfo
Oliver Youll at CricketArchive

1970 births
Living people
Cricketers from Newcastle upon Tyne
English cricketers
Northumberland cricketers